Events in the year 1924 in Spain.

Incumbents
Monarch: Alfonso XIII
President of the Council of Ministers: Miguel Primo de Rivera

Births
10 January - Eduard Admetlla i Lázaro, scuba diver (d. 2019)
25 June - Luis Suárez Fernández, historian

Deaths
18 July - Àngel Guimerà, playwright and poet (b. 1847).
Eugenio Agacino y Martínez, sailor and writer (b. 1851).

References

 
Years of the 20th century in Spain
1920s in Spain
Spain
Spain